Deborah Kay Dunn-Walters  (born September 1963) is a British immunologist who is Professor of Immunology at the University of Surrey. Her research considers B-cell development in disease. During the COVID-19 pandemic, Dunn-Walters focussed on the development of single cell analyses of the immunological responses to SARS-CoV-2. She is a member of the Scientific Advisory Group for Emergencies, and provided the government with scientific advice during the pandemic.

Early life and education 
Dunn-Walters worked toward her doctorate at the University of Surrey. Her research considered the glutathione peroxidase gene.

Research and career 
Dunn-Walters studies B cell development during disease, and how the immune system changes during ageing. She has developed new characterisation techniques to understand immune responses, including single-cell approaches. She is part of the CARINA (Catalyst Reducing Immune Ageing) Network, a collective which looks to understand how ageing impacts the immune system.

During the COVID-19 pandemic, Dunn-Walters served as a scientific advisor to the Government of the United Kingdom. She was a member of the Scientific Advisory Group for Emergencies (SAGE), and Chair of the British Society for Immunology COVID-19 Taskforce. Working with the Joint Committee on Vaccination and Immunisation (JCVI), Dunn-Walters recommended all who were able to have the COVID-19 vaccine.

Selected publications

References 

1963 births
Alumni of the University of Surrey
Living people
British immunologists
Women immunologists
20th-century British scientists
20th-century British women scientists
21st-century British scientists
21st-century British women scientists
Fellows of the Royal Society of Biology